= LEMY =

Russian singer-songwriter

LEMY Анастасия Ледовская
- Born: Anastasia Ledovskaya
- Origin: Moscow, Russia
- Genres: Indie rock, synth-pop, shoegaze
- Occupation: Singer-songwriter
- Instruments: Vocals, guitar
- Years active: 2018–present
- Label: Independent
- Website: lemymusic.co.uk

LEMY (real name Anastasia Ledovskaya) is a Russian singer-songwriter and musician. Active since 2018, she performs in both Russian and English.

== Career ==
Ledovskaya began performing under the stage name LEMY in 2018. Since 2021, she has regularly released singles on digital platforms such as Apple Music, Spotify, and YouTube.

Her first extended play, Land of Light, was released on 7 March 2024. In 2025, she released her first Russian-language album, На весь мир (To the Whole World).

The single "Просто скажи" was reviewed in the Russian magazine Sub-Cult.

She also performs regularly at festivals and gives solo concerts. Notably, she held a solo concert at the Moscow club "Tekhnika bezopasnosti" on 21 June 2025.

== Reception ==
In July 2025, LEMY's single "Boy" was awarded the Creativity’s Prize for Performing Arts.

== Style ==
Her recordings combine elements of guitar-based indie rock and electronic instrumentation.

== Discography ==
- Land of Light (EP, 2024)
- На весь мир (To the Whole World, 2025)
